Web development tools (often called devtools or inspect element) allow web developers to test and debug their source codes. They are different from website builders and integrated development environments (IDEs) in that they do not assist in the direct creation of a webpage, rather they are tools used for testing the user interface of a website or web application.

Web development tools come as browser add-ons or built-in features in web browsers. Most popular web browsers, such as Google Chrome, Firefox, Internet Explorer, Safari, Microsoft Edge and Opera, have built-in tools to help web developers, and many additional add-ons can be found in their respective plugin download centers.

Web development tools allow developers to work with a variety of web technologies, including HTML, CSS, the DOM, JavaScript, and other components that are handled by the web browser. Due to increasing demand from web browsers to do more, popular web browsers have included more features geared for developers.

Web developer tools support
Several notable web browsers have support for web developer tools that allow web designers and developers to look at the make-up of their pages. These are all tools that are built into the browser and do not require additional modules or configuration.

 Firefox –  opens the Web Console / Browser Console (since Firefox 4). The Web Console applies to a single content tab; the Browser Console applies to the whole browser. Many addons also exist, including Firebug.
 Google Chrome – Chrome Developer Tools (DevTools)
 Internet Explorer and Microsoft Edge –  opens Web Developer Tools (as of version 8)
 Opera – Opera Dragonfly
 Safari – Safari Web Development Tools (as of version 3)

Most used features
The built-in web developer tools in the browser are commonly accessed by hovering over an item on a webpage and selecting the "Inspect Element" or similar option from the context menu. Alternatively the  key tends to be another common shortcut.

HTML and the DOM
HTML and DOM viewer and editor is commonly included in the built-in web development tools. The difference between the HTML and DOM viewer, and the view source feature in web browsers is that the HTML and DOM viewer allows you to see the DOM as it was rendered in addition to allowing you to make changes to the HTML and DOM and see the change reflected in the page after the change is made.

In addition to selecting and editing, the HTML elements panels will usually also display properties of the DOM object, such as display dimension, and Cascading- style sheet properties.

Firefox versions 11 to 46 were equipped with a 3D page inspector using WebGL, where the nesting of elements was visualized with layers protruding from the page surface.

Web page assets, resources and network information
Web pages typically load and require additional content in the form of images, scripts, font and other external files. Web development tools also allow developers to inspect resources that are loaded and available on the web page in a tree-structure listing, and the appearance of style sheets can be tested in real time.

Web development tools also allow developers to view information about the network usage, such as viewing what the loading time and bandwidth usage are and which HTTP headers are being sent and received.

Profiling and auditing
Profiling allows developers to capture information about the performance of a web page or web application. With this information developers can improve the performance of their scripts. Auditing features may provide developers suggestions, after analyzing a page, for optimizations to decrease page load time and increase responsiveness. Web development tools typically also provide a record of the time it takes to render the page, memory usage, and the types of events which are taking place.

These features allow developers to optimize their web page or web application.

JavaScript debugging
JavaScript is commonly used in web browsers. Web development tools commonly include a panel to debug scripts by allowing developers to add watch expressions, breakpoints, view the call stack, and pause, step over, step into, and step out of functions while debugging JavaScript.

A JavaScript console is commonly included. The consoles allow developers to type in JavaScript commands and call functions, or view errors that may have been encountered during the execution of a script.

Extensions and plugins
Modern web browsers support the use of plugins or extensions to add or augment functionality. There are many common plugins that can provide a diverse range of additional features.

See also
Web Developer (software)
Web development life cycle

References

Web development
Programming tools